Pomacea quinindensis is a South American species of freshwater snail with gills and an operculum, an aquatic gastropod mollusc in the family Ampullariidae, the apple snails.

Distribution
P. quinindensis is endemic to Ecuador. It is currently known from only a few specimens collected from the Rio Quinindé.

References

quinindensis
Molluscs of South America
Fauna of Ecuador
Gastropods described in 1879